Offshore Group Newcastle or OGN Group are a British company that fabricate steel in North East England, often for oil platforms. It is Tyneside's largest manufacturing yard.

History

On 5 February 2016 it appeared in the episode Sea Cities Tyneside of BBC Two series Sea Cities. Also appearing in the programme was the Shields Ferry and the Port of Tyne. It also visited South Shields Marine School, part of South Tyneside College and the oldest marine school in the world, Target of Leif Höegh & Co from Norway, the Great North Run, MS Marina of Oceania Cruises, and the Old Low Light.

Political activity
The company donated over £100,000 to the Conservative Party during the 2019 United Kingdom general election

Structure
It is an offshore fabrication yard on the north bank of the River Tyne in Wallsend, near Point Pleasant, opposite the former site of Hebburn Colliery.

Products
 Gas and oil platforms.

See also
 Floating production storage and offloading
 Severfield, of North Yorkshire, who built the Gateshead Millennium Bridge
 Wallsend Slipway & Engineering Company
 :Category:Oil platforms off the United Kingdom

References

External links
 OGN Group
 Offshore Technology

Companies based in Newcastle upon Tyne
Conservative Party (UK) donors
Engineering companies of England
North Sea energy
Offshore engineering
Petroleum industry in the United Kingdom
River Tyne
Steel companies of the United Kingdom
Structural steel
Wallsend